A private army (or private military) is a military or paramilitary force consisting of armed combatants who owe their allegiance to a private person, group, or organization, rather than a nation or state.

History
Private armies may form when land owners arm household retainers for the protection of self and  property in times of strife and where and when central government is weak. Such private armies existed for example in the Roman Empire following the collapse of central authority. The dynamics at play in such circumstances can be observed in modern-day Colombia: on the one hand there are those forces affiliated with the drug cartels, existing to protect their criminality, and on the other those of the landlords created to resist kidnappings and extortion, i.e. Muerte a Secuestradores and the Autodefensas Unidas de Colombia.

In many places these private household retainers evolved into feudal like structures, formalising obligations and allegiances and becoming household troops, and in some cases gaining the strength to allow them to usurp power from their nominal suzerain or create new sovereign states.

Private armies may also form when co-religionists band together to defend themselves from real and perceived persecution and to further their creed, for example the Hussites, Mormon Nauvoo Legion and the Mahdi Army in Iraq; because of their nature such militias are formed by or fall under the influence of charismatic leaders and can become instruments of personal ambition.

Examples
Sōhei: the warrior monks of Japan owed their loyalty not to the state or even the Emperor but to their monasteries.
Victual Brothers, a pirate brotherhood that for a time became a power in the Baltic.
The Presidency armies of the British East India Company, and the armed forces of the Dutch East India Company. Both possessed powerful armies and navies, administrating areas many times the size of their homelands.
The militaries of the Indian Princely states, during the British Raj, which were mainly for ceremonial duties, protection of their princes, and internal security within their states.
Atholl Highlanders, a purely ceremonial group who claims to be the only private army in Europe.
Chinese Junfas during Warlord Era following the death of Yuan Shikai in 1916.
German Freikorps after the First World War were usually only loyal to their commanders, and not to the Weimar Republic.
The Mongoose Gang was a private army or militia which operated from 1967 to 1979 under the control of Sir Eric Gairy, the Premier and later Prime Minister of Grenada.
The Kadyrovtsy in Chechnya under President Ramzan Kadyrov.
 The Royal Johor Military Force of the state of Johor and the private royal guard of Sultan of Johor in Malaysia.
 The Russian Wagner Group has been accused of being the private army of Vladimir Putin.

See also
 Mercenary
Condottieri
Private military company
 Academi, also known as Blackwater 
 Wagner Group
 SADAT Inc.
 Regular military forces whose allegiance is to one person or group.
 Iraqi Republican Guard
 Waffen SS
 the armed branch of a political party within a nation
 Iraqi People's Army of the Iraqi Ba'ath Party
 Brownshirts  of the German NSDAP
 Blackshirts of the Italian National Fascist Party
 Blueshirts of the Chinese Kuomintang
 National Liberation Army of the People's Mujahedin of Iran
 al-Aqsa Martyrs' Brigades of the Fatah/PLO
 Izz ad-Din al-Qassam Brigades of the Hamas
 Jewish Defense League of the Kach and Kahane Chai
 Phalangist militia of the Kataeb Party
 Indian Rashtriya Swayamsevak Sangh
 Turkish Grey Wolves
 a paramilitary force
 a parapolice
 Irregular military forces: such as
 militias,
 guerrillas,
 partisans,
 insurgents,
Range war
Johnson County War
Violent non-state actor

References